Lars Mendonça Fuhre (born 29 September 1989) is a Norwegian association footballer who plays for Asker.

Club career
Described as a major youth talent, Fuhre started his career with the native club Hokksund IL before moving to Strømsgodset where he remained for three seasons. After getting limited playing time in Drammen he transferred, at the suggestion of Kjetil Rekdal, to second-tier club Nybergsund in 2008 in order to get more playing time at senior level. After two seasons however, Fuhre transferred Aalesund, the club Rekdal was now coaching, as a bosman player. The transfer-fee was estimated at 100,000 NOK (€12,500). His senior debut came on 1 August 2010 against his former teammates in the 3-1 away loss at the hands of Strømsgodset.

Whilst playing for Aalesund during the 2011–12 UEFA Europa League qualifying phase and play-off round, Fuhre scored in Aalesunds 5-1 win over Welsh team Neath F.C.

In March 2017, he signed a two year-contract with Östers IF in Superettan, Sweden's second tier.

On 23 December 2018, Fuhre signed with Asker Fotball for the 2019 season.

Career statistics

Club

References

External links
 

1989 births
Living people
People from Øvre Eiker
Norwegian people of Brazilian descent
Norwegian footballers
Norwegian expatriate footballers
Eliteserien players
Allsvenskan players
Superettan players
Norwegian First Division players
Norwegian Second Division players
Strømsgodset Toppfotball players
Nybergsund IL players
Aalesunds FK players
Hammarby Fotboll players
Östers IF players
Örgryte IS players
Asker Fotball players
Expatriate footballers in Sweden
Norwegian expatriate sportspeople in Sweden
Association football forwards
Sportspeople from Viken (county)